Daviesia argillacea is a species of flowering plant in the family Fabaceae and is endemic to the south-west of Western Australia. It is an erect, bushy shrub with erect narrow egg-shaped phyllodes with the narrower end towards the base, and yellow to orange and maroon flowers.

Description

Taxonomy and naming
Daviesia argillacea was first formally described in 1995 by Michael Crisp in Australian Systematic Botany from specimens he collected south of Norseman in 1979. The specific epithet (argillacea) means "resembling white clay", referring to the soil in which this species grows.

Distribution and habitat
This species of pea mainly grows in woodland or mallee shrubland in the area between Southern Cross, the Pallinup River, Cape Arid National Park and Lake Lefroy in the Avon Wheatbelt, Coolgardie, Esperance Plains and Mallee biogeographic regions in the south-west of Western Australia.

Conservation status
Daviesia apiculata is classified as "not threatened" by the Government of Western Australia Department of Biodiversity, Conservation and Attractions.

References

apiculata
Eudicots of Western Australia
Plants described in 1995
Taxa named by Michael Crisp